Beihang University, previously known as the Beijing University of Aeronautics and Astronautics, abbreviated as BUAA or Beihang, is a national public research university located in Beijing, China, specializing in engineering, technology, and the hard sciences.

Beihang University is designated as an eminent key university ( literally a "first-rate university" of type-A ) by China's Ministry of Education. It is one of China's key universities subsidized by the Double First Class University Plan, Project 985 and Project 211 funding. Beihang was founded on October 25, 1952, with an area of over 100 hectares.

Together with Tsinghua University, Peking University, Beijing Institute of Technology and University of Chinese Academy of Sciences, it is widely considered to be one of the top engineering universities in Beijing, with an emphasis on aeronautical and astronautical engineering, but also covering diverse fields in the natural sciences, high technology, economics, management, the liberal arts, law, philosophy, foreign languages and education.

History

The early years
Beihang was formed in 1952 from a merger of the aeronautical departments of Tsinghua University, Peiyang University, Xiamen University, Sichuan University, Yunnan University, Northwestern Engineering College, North China University and Southwest Aeronautical Institute.

The meeting announcing the founding of the Beijing Institute of Aeronautics (BIA) was held in the auditorium of the Beijing Institute of Technology on October 25, 1952. In the early days of the university most of the faculty and students lived on the campuses of Tsinghua University and the Beijing Institute of Technology but moved to BaiYanZhuang Village in the Haidian District on May, 1953. Construction  started on June 1, 1953. More than 60,000m2 of buildings were completed within six months. By October 1953 the students and faculty had moved to the new campus and started their daily work and study. Initially there were two departments with four majors: Aeroplane Design and Aeroplane Technology in the Department of Aeroplane Engineering and Engine Design and Engine Technology in the Department of Aeroplane Engine Engineering.

BUAA was among China's first 16 key universities in the 1950s and was among the top 15 for priority development during China's 7th Five-Year Plan period (1986–1990). During the 8th Five-Year plan it was listed among the top 14 for priority development and at the start of the 9th Five-Year Plan BUAA was among the first batch of 15 universities in project 211 for Higher Education.

Name change
In 1952 the university was named the Beijing Institute of Aeronautics. In May 1988 it was renamed to Beijing University of Aeronautics and Astronautics (BUAA). In 2002 the university changed the English name of the university to Beihang University but retained the acronym BUAA.

Currently
The university has 59 undergraduate programs, 38 master's degree programs, 21 doctorate programs and 17 postdoctoral researcher programs. At present the university has 27 schools covering ten major disciplines. The total number of faculty and staff is 3,759, including 26 academicians from the Chinese Academy of Sciences and Chinese Academy of Engineering as well as 1,668 professors. BUAA is the home of 27,811 students and about 668 international students   It has 89 laboratories including a National Lab and seven State Key Laboratories. The university is equipped with ancillary facilities. Its library, with an area of over 24,000 m2, has a collection of over 1.2 million.

In 2005 the École Centrale partnered with BUAA to create an engineering graduate program called École Centrale de Pékin. The program's intake consisted of the very best Chinese students graduating the National College Entrance Examination. In 2018 the French Civil Aviation University partnered with the university to create a civil aviation university in Hangzhou.

BUAA has sports facilities including modern gymnasiums and sports grounds.

Anniversary and homecoming
October 25 is the anniversary and the following weekend is the homecoming weekend.

Blue and white, which symbolize the sky and clouds, are the official school colors.

Education and teaching

Ranking
 Beihang University is among China's top engineering universities. It is subsidized by the prestigious Project-211 funding and Project-985 funding. Together with Tsinghua University, Peking University, Beijing Institute of Technology and University of Chinese Academy of Sciences, it is widely considered to be one of the top engineering universities in Beijing, with an emphasis on aeronautical and astronautical engineering, but also covering diverse fields in the natural sciences, high technology, economics, management, the liberal arts, law, philosophy, foreign languages, and education.

BUAA has 42 research institutes or interdisciplinary research centers, 11 key disciplines of the national level and 89 laboratories (including 4 national key laboratories, 5 national specialized laboratories, and 12 provincial or ministerial-level key laboratories). Beihang ranks among China's top universities by research funding. Beihang is also among China's top research universities for the development of military technology. It is administered by the  Ministry of Industry and Information Technology. Beihang has been allotted the highest budget amongst all universities under the ministry.

The library, with an area of over 24,000 m2, has a collection of over 1.2 million books. BUAA's sports facilities include an Olympic modern gymnasium and a sports ground.

International academic exchange
BUAA has established cooperation with 152 universities and research institutions from 40 countries including Canada, UK, France, Germany, Russia, the United States and Sri Lanka. 122 scholars have been invited as honorary professors to Beihang University. Every year an average of 1000 foreign experts and scholars come to BUAA to lecture and to take part in international conferences and discussions of scientific cooperation. Every year over 600 BUAA faculties go abroad to give lectures, participate in academic conferences and conduct cooperative scientific research.

Since 2005 Beihang University and Groupe des Écoles Centrales have cooperated under the support of the governments of China and France to jointly establish the Sino-French Engineer School in Beijing.

Since the 1990s Beihang University has been one of the few universities in China that use English as the primary medium of instruction for all its international master and doctoral programs. It also offers many bachelor's degree programs in English.

Since 1993 more than 9,000 students from over 80 countries have enrolled at Beihang University.

Undergraduate
Beihang's undergraduate education is focused on training specialized graduates to ensure success in their field. Centering on this aim, BUAA has a credit-based education plan which is a flexible way for students to plan their college life.

Postgraduate
BUAA is among China's very first academic institutes with a graduate school. It also has the authority to select its academic staff for the supervision of doctorate students instead of obtaining external approval from China's Ministry of Education.

Teaching
BUAA was among the nation's first 16 key universities back in the 1950s and among the top 15 for priority development during China's 7th five-year plan period (1986–1990). During the 8th five-year plan it was listed among the top 14 for priority development and at the start of the 9th five-year plan BUAA was among the first batch of 15 universities in "Project 211 for Higher Education." As it entered the new millennium the university was listed in China's Action Plan for the Revitalization of Education in the 21st Century. BUAA has grown into an open, multi-disciplined, research-oriented university of engineering science and technology with an emphasis on aeronautical and astronautical engineering. The university now has 40 undergraduate majors, 65 master programs and 36 second-level doctorate programs in 2nd level disciplines and 12 post-doctorate stations. In ten disciplines of the 1st level BUAA is authorized to confer doctor and master's degrees.

Affiliated Schools
Beihang University contains within itself an elementary school, a middle school and a high school. These schools are exclusive to the children of university staff although non-staff openings are occasionally available to the public.

Research

BUAA is home to some of China's key research laboratories including the National Laboratory of Software Development Environment, National Computational Fluid Dynamics Laboratory, National Laboratory of Aero-engine and Air Heat and the National Laboratory of Aeronautics and Astronautics.

BUAA is one of the Seven Sons of National Defence.

The university has more than 40 projects ranked first in the country and has received over 900 awards for achievements. BUAA is one of the top-ranked universities in the field of high tech. BUAA has launched spacecraft including the Beijing -1, Beijing -2, Beijing -5 and the BEE series of coaxial rotors helicopter. BUAA has also invented a flight simulator in automation, a silicon compiler in computer science, a Phase Change Disk in material and information storage, a robot of multi-degree freedom in artificial intelligence and assisted in the successful launch of the Shenzhou spacecraft.

The university established six major state labs including the Lab of Aero Engine Gasdynamics and Thermodynamics, the State Lab of Computational Fluid Dynamics, the Lab of Software Development Environment and the National Base of Mechanics as well as 12 major labs at provincial levels. The funding for scientific research at BUAA has increased at an annual rate of over 20% which ranks among the top universities in China for achievements, funding and academic standing.

SRTP
In 2005 BUAA initiated the Student Research Training Program (SRTP) to involve undergraduates in research through credit incentives. All granted projects are funded by the Student Academic Office. Excellent project holders are given extra credits for their achievements. Students often publish papers and file patent applications during the training program.

Student life

Feng Ru Cup
The Feng Ru Cup, named after China's first aircraft designer and aviator Feng Ru, is an annual student competition. It is similar to the senior project found in US universities. This competition attracts thousands of students each year.

Student societies
There are various student societies from sport clubs to scientific interest groups. Student scientific and engineering innovation groups may receive funds from different entities, e.g. departments, schools and companies.

Notable alumni

Jiang Bin, billionaire co-founder of GoerTek
Li Peiyao 李沛瑶, former vice chairman of the Standing Committee of the Chinese People's Political Consultative Conference
Qi Faren, chief engineer of the Shenzhou space project
Xue Yiwei, Chinese writer resident in Montreal, Canada
Yang Dongming, lieutenant general, former deputy commander of the PLA Air Force
Yuan Jiajun 袁家军, member of the 20th Politburo, former chief of the Shenzhou program
Zhang Guoguang, former governor of Liaoning and Hubei

Aircraft projects
Beijing 1
BUAA Mifeng-6

See also 

 Beijing Air and Space Museum

References

External links
 Beijing University of Aeronautics and Astronautics Press
 International Student Admission
Campus photography by Beihang students
Beihang University
Beihang University campus

 
Educational institutions established in 1952
Project 211
Project 985
Plan 111
Universities and colleges in Haidian District
1952 establishments in China
Vice-ministerial universities in China